Clifford J. Lee is the 45th Mayor of the city of Charlottetown, Prince Edward Island, Canada, first elected in 2003. He was re-elected three times and held the office until 2018, but announced in April of that year that he would not contest that year's municipal election. His final term ended on December 6, 2018.

See also
 List of mayors of Charlottetown
 Charlottetown City Council

References

Mayors of Charlottetown
Year of birth missing (living people)
Living people